Joris Kayembe Ditu (born 8 August 1994) is a Belgian professional footballer who as a winger plays for Belgian First Division A club Charleroi and the Belgium national team.

Club career
Born in Brussels, Kayembe started his youth career in Belgium with R.S.D. Jette then FC Brussels and Standard Liége.

In 2013, he signed for FC Porto. Along with some other players of the team, Kayembe was called to the first-team squad to face S.C. Olhanense. After a very good first season with the B squad he finally made his debut on 4 May 2014, coming as a 46th-minute substitute for Tozé.

Kayembe started the 2014–15 season with Porto's first team but appeared mainly in B squad. In January 2015, he was loaned to F.C. Arouca.

On 31 July 2015, Kayembe was loaned to fellow Primeira Liga team Rio Ave F.C.

International career
Kayembe was born in Belgium and is of Congolese descent. Kayembe debuted with the Belgium national football team in a 1–1 friendly draw with Ivory Coast on 8 October 2020.

Career statistics

References

External links

1994 births
Living people
Belgian footballers
Belgium youth international footballers
Belgium under-21 international footballers
Belgium international footballers
Belgian sportspeople of Democratic Republic of the Congo descent
Association football forwards
FC Porto B players
FC Porto players
F.C. Arouca players
Rio Ave F.C. players
FC Nantes players
R. Charleroi S.C. players
Ligue 1 players
Primeira Liga players
Liga Portugal 2 players
Belgian Pro League players
Belgian expatriate footballers
Belgian expatriate sportspeople in Portugal
Belgian expatriate sportspeople in France
Expatriate footballers in Portugal
Expatriate footballers in France
Black Belgian sportspeople